The bulava or buława (Polish spelling: buława; Ukrainian spelling:  булава [bula'va]) is a ceremonial mace or baton or sceptre.

Poland, Grand Duchy of Lithuania, Polish–Lithuanian Commonwealth
Historically the buława was an attribute of a hetman, an officer of the highest military rank  (after the monarch) in the 15th- to 18th-century Kingdom of Poland and the Polish–Lithuanian Commonwealth.

Hetmans typically added an image of a buława to their coats of arms.

Today the buława appears in the rank insignia of a Marshal of Poland.

Ukraine
In the Ukrainian language, a булава (bulava) is a mace or club, in both the military and ceremonial senses. The bulava was one of the Ukrainian Cossack kleinody (клейноди - "regalia", or literally: "jewels"): Bohdan Khmelnytsky bore a bulava as Hetman of the Zaporizhian Host (in office: 1648 to 1657).

Historically the bulava was an attribute of a hetman, an officer of the highest military rank, and of the Otaman of Ukraine or the military head of a Cossack state (Cossack Hetmanate).

The Ukrainian People's Republic of 1917-1920 referred to the General Staff of the Ukrainian People's Army as the "General Bulava".

A ceremonial bulava is now an official emblem of the President of Ukraine, and is housed in Ukraine's Vernadsky National Library.

Ukrainian military heraldry often features bulava-images, particularly as a part of rank insignia for generals and admirals, as well as an element of the insignia of the Ministry of Defence and of the NSDC.

Gallery

See also

 Baton (military)
 Pernach
 Polish heraldry
 RSM-56 Bulava

References

Ceremonial weapons
Clubs (weapon)

Regalia of Ukraine
Marshals of Poland
Presidency of Ukraine
Military organization of Cossacks
Ceremonial maces